Richlands railway station is located on the Springfield line in Queensland, Australia. It serves the Brisbane suburb of Richlands.

History
Richlands opened on 17 January 2011 as the terminus of what was then the Richlands Line. The line has since been extended to Springfield Central.

The station multi-storey car park has 650 car parking spaces for vehicles.

Construction and opening
Construction started on the station on 1 July 2008. The planning included about 650 car parks, a bus interchange, bicycle lockers and a drop-off area.

The station was due to open on 23 January 2011 with no services due to scheduled maintenance works on the Ipswich line, but due to the Queensland floods the opening was brought forward to 17 January 2011 in order to assist with the recovery efforts. On 2 December 2013, the line was extended to Springfield Central.

Services
Richlands is served by trains operating to and from Springfield Central. Most city-bound services run to Kippa-Ring, with some morning peak trains terminating at Bowen Hills. Mid-afternoon services on weekdays run to Caboolture, with one morning and afternoon peak service to Nambour. Three trains on Sunday morning also travel to these destinations; two to Caboolture and one to Nambour. On Monday to Thursday afternoons, there is one Doomben train (this time slot is replaced by a Bowen Hills train on Fridays). Richlands is nine minutes from Springfield Central and 32 minutes from Central.

Services by platform

Transport links
Brisbane Transport operate two routes from Richlands station:
101: Oxley station to Forest Lake via Inala
460: City to Heathwood via Forest Lake Shops

References

External links

Richlands station Queensland Rail
[ Richlands station] TransLink travel information

Railway stations in Brisbane
Railway stations in Australia opened in 2011